Stop All That Jazz is an album by singer and songwriter Leon Russell. The album was recorded in 1974 at Leon Russell's House Studio in Tulsa, Oklahoma; Paradise Studios in Tia Juana, Oklahoma; Pete's Place in Nashville, Tennessee; and Shelter The Church Studio, in Tulsa. Stop All That Jazz is Russell's sixth solo album.

The Gap Band, a funky group of Tulsans, backed Leon on the Stop All That Jazz album. Through the Stop All That Jazz album Leon introduced the world to The Gap Band. The Gap Band then released their debut album Magician's Holiday on Leon's Shelter Records label. Later Leon played piano on the group's 1977 The Gap Band release.

The album shows Russell's creativity, coming after his country music album Hank Wilson's Back Vol. I. There is a diverse array of songs on the album, some jazz as well as synthesizers and programmed drum machines. There are some standards written by others: Bob Dylan's "The Ballad Of Hollis Brown," Tim Hardin's "If I Were A Carpenter" and "Wild Horses" by The Rolling Stones. Willie Nelson helped with the album and sang on the song "Wabash Cannonball."  The album was produced by Tom Cartwright, Leon Russell and Denny Cordell.

Track listing
All songs written by Leon Russell except where noted.

Side one

Side two
 	
Bonus tracks

 Note: "Time For Love" is incorrectly listed as 3:40 on the sleeve/record centre. 4:00 is the correct time.

Charts

Personnel

Leon Russell - Banjo, Bass, Composer, Guitar, Keyboards, Piano, Piano (Electric), Primary Artist
Willie Nelson - Guest Artist, Guitar, Guitar (Rhythm), Performer, Primary Artist, Vocals
Ann Bell - Vocals, Vocals (Background)
Henry Best - Bass
Chuck Blackwell - Drums
J.J. Cale - Guitar, Guitar (Electric)
Chris Clayton - Horn, Vocals (Background)
Joey Cooper - Guitar, Vocals
John Gallie - Keyboards, Programming
Linda Hargrove - Guitar, Guitar (Acoustic)
Karl Himmel - Drums
Jim Keltner - Bass, Drums
William Kenner - Mandolin
Marcy Levy - Vocals, Vocals (Background)
Tommy Lokey - Horn, Vocals (Background)
Jamie Oldaker - Drums
Don Preston - Dobro, Guitar, Vocals
Carl Radle - Bass
Edwin Scruggs - Guitar, Guitar (Acoustic)
Lena Stephens - Vocals, Vocals (Background)
Odell Stokes -	Guitar
Pam Thompson -	Vocals, Vocals (Background)
Cam Wilson - Organ, Percussion, Vocals (Background)
Charlie Wilson - Keyboards, Vocals
Ric Wilson - Bass
Robert Sinclair Wilson - Bass, Drums
Ronald Wilson - Horn, Vocals (Background)
Pete Drake - Engineer, Guitar (Steel)
Tom Cartwright - Producer
Denny Cordell - Producer
Tom Russell - Engineer
Tami Masak - Assistant Engineer, Assistant Producer
Terence P. Minogue - Assistant Engineer, Assistant Producer
Kent Duncan - Engineer
Steve Hoffman - Engineer
Cheryl Pawelski - Assistant Engineer, Assistant Producer
Bernadette Fauver - Assistant Engineer, Assistant Producer
Margaret Goldfarb - Assistant Engineer, Assistant Producer
John LeMay - Engineer
Charles Levan - Assistant Engineer, Assistant Producer
Tom Wilkes - Design

References

External links
YouTube, Stop All That Jazz, Leon Russell 

Leon Russell discography
Leon Russell Records
Leon Russell NAMM Oral History Program Interview (2012)

1974 albums
Leon Russell albums
Shelter Records albums
Albums produced by Leon Russell